The Australian Competitive Grants Register (ACGR) was a centralised register that listed funding schemes that were approved by the Australian Government as being "competitive research grants" to Australian higher education providers. The ACGR was released for the last time in 2018 and is no longer updated as it has been replaced by a mechanism that allows universities to self-assess their research income.

Funding bodies 
The register has included schemes from the following funding bodies and organisations since 2008:

The register before 2008 included schemes from the following funding bodies:
 Australian Dental Research Foundation
 Australian Greenhouse Office
 NICTA

See also 
 Backing Australia's Ability
 List of Australian Commonwealth Government entities

References

External links 
 

Research in Australia
Funding bodies of Australia